Hiu or HIU may refer to:
 Hiw Island, or Hiu, in Vanuatu
 Hiw language, or Hiu, spoken on Hiu Island
 Hiu Station, in Sasebo City, Nagasaki, Japan
 Helmholtz Institute Ulm, in Germany
 Hope International University, in Fullerton, California